The Taylor Titch is a British fixed-wing homebuilt aircraft, developed in the 1960s by J.F. Taylor. , examples  are still being built and flown.

Development

Taylor designed the Titch as an entry in the 1964 Midget Racer Design Competition promoted by Rollason. Among the criteria requested was that it had to be a single-seater powered by a Rollason Ardem flat-four engine, design limits were ±6g, maximum wing area of 65 sq ft and a maximum weight of 750lbs. As a result of Taylor designed a high performance single-seater, the Titch based on his earlier Taylor Monoplane.

At the closing date of the competition 42 designs had been submitted which was won by a project named Beta but the Titch was placed second.

Taylor built the prototype, registered G-ATYO, at Leigh-on-Sea, Essex between 1965 and 1966. The Titch first flew at Southend Airport on 4 January 1967.

The designer John Taylor was killed when the prototype Titch crashed at Southend on 16 May 1967. The marketing of plans for both his aircraft designs were taken on by his wife and later his son.

, 40 examples had been completed and flown.

Design
The Titch is a single-seat low-wing cantilever monoplane of all wood construction similar to the Monoplane but has fewer metal fittings than the earlier design and full size wing rib plans are supplied for the tapered wing panels.  With a cruise speed in the region of 160 mph (260 km/h), it is an effective cross-country touring aircraft and is also fully aerobatic. Builders can fit it with either a Continental or a Lycoming engine.

Specifications (Prototype)

See also

Notes

References

Notes

Bibliography

 Bayerl, Robby, Martin Berkemeier et al. World Directory of Leisure Aviation 2011–12. Lancaster UK: WDLA UK, 2011. .
 Dunnell, Ben. "Aeroplane Archive: Taylor Made". Aeroplane, Volume 45, No. 6, June 2017. pp. 127–129. .
 Jackson, A.J. British Civil Aircraft since 1919, Volume 3. London: Putnam, 1974. .
 Purdy, Don: AeroCrafter: Homebuilt Aircraft Sourcebook, Fifth Edition. Benicia, California: BAI Communications, 1998. .
 Taylor, John W.R. (ed.) Jane's All The World's Aircraft 1969–70. London: Jane's Yearbooks. 1969.
 Taylor, John W.R. (ed.) Jane's All The World's Aircraft 1980–81. London: Jane's Publishing, 1980. .

External links

 Taylortitch.co.uk
 Pictures on Light Aircraft Association website

1960s British sport aircraft
Homebuilt aircraft
Aircraft first flown in 1967
Racing aircraft
Low-wing aircraft
Single-engined tractor aircraft